Apanteles is a very large genus of braconid wasps, containing more than 600 described species found worldwide. There are no native species in New Zealand, and none have been recorded in the high arctic.

See also
 List of Apanteles species

References

Further reading

 
 
 

Microgastrinae
Braconidae genera